Sălătrucu is a commune in Argeș County, in Muntenia, Romania. It is composed of two villages, Sălătrucu and Văleni.

The Battle of Sălătrucu took place here, 16–23 October 1916, during the Romanian Campaign of World War I.

References

Communes in Argeș County
Localities in Muntenia